The 2022 Louisville Cardinals women's soccer team represented University of Louisville during the 2022 NCAA Division I women's soccer season.  The Cardinals were led by head coach Karen Ferguson-Dayes, in her twenty-third season.  They played home games at Lynn Stadium.  This was the team's 38th season playing organized women's college soccer and their 9th playing in the Atlantic Coast Conference.

The Cardinals finished the season 6–8–2 overall and 3–7–0 in ACC play to finish in tenth place.  The team did not qualify for the ACC Tournament and were not invited to the NCAA Tournament.

Previous season 

The Cardinals finished the season 7–7–2 overall and 3–6–1 in ACC play to finish in eleventh place.  The team did not qualify for the ACC Tournament and were not invited to the NCAA Tournament.

Offseason

Departures

Incoming Transfers

Recruiting Class

Source:

Squad

Roster

Team management

Source:

Schedule

Source:

|-
!colspan=6 style=""| Exhibition

|-
!colspan=6 style=""| Non-Conference Regular Season

|-
!colspan=6 style=""| ACC Regular Season

Rankings

References

Louisville
Louisville
2022
Louisville women's soccer